Pak Island is an island of Papua New Guinea. It is in the Admiralty Islands group of the Bismarck Archipelago.

Islands of Papua New Guinea